Tân Ân may refer to several places in Vietnam, including:

 Tân Ân, Cà Mau, a rural commune of Ngọc Hiển District
 , a rural commune of Cần Đước District